Mehragaon is a Village in Narmadapuram district in the Indian state of Madhya Pradesh.

Demographics
 India census, Mehara Gaon had a population of 4,306. Males constitute 52% of the population and females 48%. Mehara Gaon has an average literacy rate of 75%, higher than the national average of 59.5%: male literacy is 82%, and female literacy is 67%. In Mehara Gaon, 12% of the population is under 6 years of age.

References

Cities and towns in Narmadapuram district
Narmadapuram